Zvenyhorod mean villages in the Western Ukraine.

Zvenyhorod may also refer to:

 Zvenyhorod - in Lviv Raion, Lviv Oblast. It was the former capital of the Zvenyhorod Principality
 Zvenyhorod, Ternopil Oblast - in Ternopil Oblast

See also 

 Zvenyhorodka
 Zvenigorod